German submarine U-376 was a Type VIIC U-boat of Nazi Germany's Kriegsmarine during World War II.

The submarine was laid down on 3 April 1940 in Kiel, launched on 10 July 1941, and commissioned on 21 August 1941 under the command of Oberleutnant zur See Friedrich-Karl Marks.

U-376 was attached to the 6th U-boat Flotilla, and was ready for front-line service from 1 March 1942. Operating from Norwegian bases, from 1 July 1942 she served with the 11th U-boat Flotilla, and was transferred to the 3rd U-boat Flotilla, based in France on 1 March 1943.

U-376 sailed on eight combat patrols, sinking only two merchant ships totalling 10,146 GRT before she went missing in the Bay of Biscay since 7 April 1943.

Construction and Design

Construction

U-376 was ordered by the Kriegsmarine on 16 October 1939. She was laid down about six months later at the Howaldtswerke yard in Kiel, on 3 April 1940. Just over a year and three months later, U-376 was launched in Kiel on 10 July 1941. She was formally commissioned into the Kriegsmarine later that year on 21 August.

Design
German Type VIIC submarines were preceded by the shorter Type VIIB submarines. U-376 had a displacement of  when at the surface and  while submerged. She had two shafts and two  propellers.

U-376 was fitted with five  torpedo tubes (four fitted at the bow and one at the stern), fourteen torpedoes, one  SK C/35 naval gun, 220 rounds, and a  C/30 anti-aircraft gun. The boat had a complement of between forty-four and sixty.

Service history

First patrol
U-376, under the command of Kapitänleutnant Friedrich-Karl Marks, left Kiel on 11 March 1942, arriving at Heligoland in the North Sea the next day. She sailed on her first combat patrol on the 15th, heading north into the Barents Sea. There, on 30 March she torpedoed and sank the 5,086 GRT British merchant ship Induna, part of the Arctic convoy PQ 13, en -route to Murmansk.

Only 30 were still alive on 2 April when they were picked up by a Russian minesweeper, two subsequently died of exposure.

The U-boat arrived at Kirkenes in the far northeast of Norway, on 1 April 1942.

Second and third patrols
U-376 sailed on two patrols from Kirkenes, from 7 to 20 April, and from 29 April to 6 May, without success, before sailing to Bergen in Norway in early May.

Fourth patrol
U-376 left Bergen on 7 June 1942, sailing to the waters north of Iceland before returning to the Barents Sea. where on 10 July, she sank the 5,060 GRT American Hog Islander Hoosier, en route to Arkhangelsk with a cargo of 5,029 tons of machinery and explosives, and tanks as deck cargo. Part of Convoy PQ 17, the ship had been bombed the previous day by several Junkers Ju 88 aircraft of KG 30, which had disabled the engines. Taken in tow by  she was abandoned when  was sighted in pursuit. The drifting wreck of Hoosier was hit by two torpedoes from U-376 and sank.

The U-boat arrived at Narvik on 15 July, sailing to Bergen after three days, before spending August to October at Wilhelmshaven and Kiel. She returned to Bergen on 25 October, then sailed to Skjomenfjord on 3 November 1942.

Fifth patrol
U-376 left Skjomenfjord on 5 November to patrol the Barents Sea once more, arriving at Narvik on 8 December, having had no success.

Sixth patrol
She returned to Bergen before setting out once more on 26 January 1943, but was attacked by Allied aircraft the next day and was forced to return to base with several crewmen wounded.

Seventh patrol
The U-boat left Bergen on 30 January, but during the night her third watch officer was washed overboard. U-376 returned to Bergen to embark a replacement and departed the same day. This patrol took her out into the Atlantic, south of Greenland, before she arrived at her new home port of La Pallice in France on 13 March.

Eighth patrol and loss
U-376 sailed from La Pallice on 6 April 1943 on a mission to take on board German Naval officers who had escaped from a prisoner of war camp at North Point on Prince Edward Island, Canada. U-376 was preceded by the mission's backup boat, which had left from the same port on 27 March, but had had to return due to a defective air vent, and sailed again on 7 April.

U-376 was missing since 7 April 1943 in the Bay of Biscay.

Previously recorded fate
A postwar assessment claimed that U-376 was sunk April 10, 1943 in the Bay of Biscay west of Nantes, France at position  by depth charges from a British Wellington aircraft of Squadron 172/C. This attack was actually against , inflicting severe damage.

Wolfpacks
U-376 took part in nine wolfpacks, namely:
 Zieten (23 – 29 March 1942) 
 Eiswolf (29 – 31 March 1942) 
 Robbenschlag (7 – 14 April 1942) 
 Blutrausch (15 – 19 April 1942) 
 Strauchritter (29 April – 5 May 1942) 
 Eisteufel (1 – 4 July 1942) 
 Eisteufel (6 – 12 July 1942) 
 Boreas (19 November – 7 December 1942) 
 Neptun (18 February – 2 March 1943)

Summary of raiding history

References

Bibliography

External links

German Type VIIC submarines
U-boats commissioned in 1941
U-boats sunk in 1943
Missing U-boats of World War II
World War II submarines of Germany
1941 ships
Ships built in Kiel
U-boats sunk by unknown causes
Maritime incidents in April 1943